The Age of Mastery is the fourth studio album released by American power metal band Jag Panzer, released in 1998. Lead guitarist Joey Tafolla was replaced by Chris Broderick. "False Messiah" is a Jack Starr cover.

Track listing

Credits
Harry Conklin – Vocals
Mark Briody – Guitars
Chris Broderick – Guitars
John Tetley – Bass guitar
Rikard Stjernquist – Drums

1998 albums
Jag Panzer albums
Century Media Records albums